Raukaua edgerleyi is a species of plant which is native to New Zealand. An example occurrence in Westland District Podocarp/broadleaf forests includes flora associates such as Cyathea smithii, Dicksonia squarrosa and Blechnum discolor.

References
 C. Michael Hogan. 2009. Crown Fern: Blechnum discolor, Globaltwitcher.com, ed. N. Stromberg
 Peter Wardle. 1991. Vegetation of New Zealand, Published by CUP Archive, 672 pages

Line notes

edgerleyi
Flora of New Zealand
Endemic flora of New Zealand